Chiff-Chaffs and Willow Warblers is the debut album by Minotaur Shock, released in 2001.

Track listing
 "Websites" – 0:42
 "Roman Answer" – 4:37 
 "First to Back Down" – 4:25 
 "Moray Arrival" – 5:08
 "Chance Anthem" – 2:34 
 "The Range" – 5:24
 "Local Violin Shop" – 4:47
 "Three Magpies" – 5:52 
 "There is a Dog" – 3:13
 "Out of the Hot" – 5:30 
 "Primary" – 4:58

Release history

Personnel
David Edwards – Programming and Instruments

References

Minotaur Shock albums
2001 debut albums